Wang Xin; birth name Wang Ruoxue, born  in Wuhan, Hubei) is a Chinese athlete who competes in diving.

She initially trained at
Tsinghua University with controversial diving coach Yu Fen before moving to the national team in 2006.

She competed for Team China at the 2008 Summer Olympics in Beijing.

Major achievements

 2008-02-20 Silver medal at the 2008 16th FINA Diving World Cup (Good Luck Beijing) - 10m platform event.
 2008-02-21 Gold medal at the 2008 16th FINA Diving World Cup (Good Luck Beijing), paired with Chen Ruolin - 10m platform synchro event.
 2008-08-11 Gold medal at the 2008 Beijing Olympics, paired with Chen Ruolin - 10m platform synchro event.
 2008-08-21 Bronze medal at the 2008 Beijing Olympics - 10m platform event.

References

1992 births
Living people
Chinese female divers
Divers at the 2008 Summer Olympics
Olympic divers of China
Olympic bronze medalists for China
Olympic gold medalists for China
Olympic medalists in diving
Asian Games medalists in diving
Sportspeople from Wuhan
Divers at the 2006 Asian Games
Medalists at the 2008 Summer Olympics
World Aquatics Championships medalists in diving
Asian Games gold medalists for China
Medalists at the 2006 Asian Games
Universiade medalists in diving
Universiade gold medalists for China
Universiade bronze medalists for China
Medalists at the 2011 Summer Universiade
21st-century Chinese women